Sobranie ("Gathering", "Collection", "Assembly") is a brand of cigarettes, currently owned and manufactured by Gallaher Group, a subsidiary of Japan Tobacco.

History

The Balkan Sobranie tobacco business was established in London in 1879 by Albert Weinberg (born Romania 1849), whose naturalization papers dated 1886 confirm his nationality and show that he had emigrated to England in the 1870s at a time when hand-made cigarettes in the eastern European and Russian tradition were becoming fashionable in Europe.  It is one of the oldest cigarette brands in the world. Albert's young cousin Isaiah Redstone (1884-1963) joined him in the business and registered the "Balkan Sobranie" trademark, later shortened to Sobranie.  
By 1910 Albert was manufacturing at 34 Glasshouse Street, London. After Albert's death Isaiah Redstone and his sons Charles Coleman Redstone (1911-1994) and Dr. Isidore Redstone (1925-2022) continued to own and manage the business.  In the early 1980s the Sobranie trademarks were sold to Gallaher Group, which continued production with a modified formula at various locations in Europe. Gallaher was subsequently purchased by Japan Tobacco in 2007.

Throughout its existence, Sobranie was marketed as the definition of luxury in the tobacco industry, being adopted as the official provider of many European royal houses and elites around the world including the Imperial Court of Russia and the royal courts of United Kingdom of Great Britain and Ireland, Spain, Romania, and Greece.

Premium brands include the multi-coloured Sobranie Cocktail and the black and gold Sobranie Black Russian, which are produced in Ukraine. Sobranie Cocktail, Black Russian and White Russian variants are emblazoned with the Russian imperial eagle.

Sponsorships

The logos were displayed on the front, side and rear wing of the cars. In countries where tobacco sponsorship was forbidden, the logos were removed or replaced. Sobranie was primarily a replacement for Jordan's primary tobacco sponsor, Benson & Hedges (a Gallaher-owned brand in the United Kingdom), in United States Grands Prix, to circumvent the Tobacco Master Settlement Agreement, as Philip Morris USA (who holds the Benson & Hedges trademark in the United States) was exclusively (as required by the MSA) sponsoring Team Penske in American open-wheel racing with their Marlboro brand.

Markets

Sobranie cigarettes were mainly sold in the United Kingdom until the introduction of plain packaging, but also were or still are sold in India, Germany, Bulgaria, France, Switzerland, Poland, Romania, Greece, Belarus, Ukraine, Russia, Georgia, Kazakhstan, Singapore, Armenia, Azerbaijan, Croatia, Serbia, North Macedonia, Bosnia and Herzegovina, Malaysia, China, Taiwan, Montenegro and Japan as well as many duty free shops in airports.

See also
Fashion brands
Smoking culture
Coat of arms of Russia
 Tobacco smoking
 Drina (cigarette)
 Elita (cigarette)
 Filter 57 (cigarette)
 Jadran (cigarette)
 Laika (cigarette)
 Lovćen (cigarette)
 Morava (cigarette)
 Partner (cigarette)
 Smart (cigarette)
 Time (cigarette)
 Jin Ling
 LD (cigarette)
 Walter Wolf (cigarette)

References

Russian cigarette brands
Gallaher Group brands
Japan Tobacco brands
Defunct companies based in London
1879 introductions